James Brophy (8 January 1912 in Cork – 23 September 1994 in County Meath) was an Irish cricketer. A right-handed batsman and wicket-keeper, he played just once for Ireland, a first-class match against Scotland in  July 1938.

References
CricketEurope Stats Zone profile
Cricket Archive profile
Cricinfo profile

1912 births
1994 deaths
Irish cricketers
Sportspeople from Cork (city)
Wicket-keepers